Saïd Bouchouk (born December 29, 1986) is an Algerian football player who plays for JS Kabylie in the Algerian Ligue Professionnelle 1.

Club career
Born in El Eulma, Bouchouk began his career in the junior ranks FC Bir El Arch. In 2005, he was promoted to the senior side, where he spent the next five seasons. In 2010, he had a successful trial with Ligue 2 side CA Batna, signing a four year contract with the club.

On January 29, 2012, Bouchouk was loaned by CA Batna to Saudi Professional League club Al-Qadisiyah FC until the end of the season.

International career
On October 25, 2011, Bouchouk received a surprise call up from Vahid Halilhodžić to the Algerian National Team for a pair of friendlies against Tunisia and Cameroon. He did not play in the first game against Tunisia, remaining on the bench as Algeria won 1-0. The second game against Cameroon was cancelled and replaced with an intra-squad scrimmage. Coming at half-time, Bouchouk scored a goal and had two assists as his Algeria White team won 4-1 against Algeria Green.

References

External links
 
 

1986 births
Al-Qadsiah FC players
Algerian expatriate sportspeople in Saudi Arabia
Algerian footballers
Algerian Ligue Professionnelle 1 players
Algerian Ligue 2 players
CA Batna players
Expatriate footballers in Saudi Arabia
Saudi Professional League players
Living people
People from El Eulma
JS Kabylie players
Association football forwards
21st-century Algerian people